A sediment control is a practice or device designed to keep eroded soil on a construction site, so that it does not wash off and cause water pollution to a nearby stream, river, lake, or sea. Sediment controls are usually employed together with erosion controls, which are designed to prevent or minimize erosion and thus reduce the need for sediment controls.  Sediment controls are generally designed to be temporary measures, however, some can be used for storm water management purposes.

Commonly used sediment controls

Check dam
Diversion dike (temporary)
Fiber rolls
Gabions
Siltbusters
Sand bag barrier
Sediment basin 
Sediment trap
Silt fence
Storm drain inlet protection
Straw bale barrier
Turbidity curtain

Active treatment systems
Chemical treatment of sediment, commonly called an active treatment system, is a relatively new form of sediment control for the construction industry.  It is designed to reduce turbidity in nearby water bodies and involves collection of sediment-laden stormwater in a basin or tank, and adding a chemical flocculant. An example video of chemical dosing on slow settling solids is on YouTube.  This causes the sediment to settle so it can be more easily removed from the water.  Some of the flocculent chemicals used for sediment treatment are chitosan and  polymers such as polyacrylamide. The water is then pumped through a removal system, such as a Siltbuster, sand or cartridge filter, prior to discharge. Chemical sediment control is currently used on some construction sites around the United States and Europe, typically larger sites where there is a high potential for damage to nearby streams.

Another active treatment system design uses electrocoagulation to flocculate suspended particles in the stormwater, followed by a filtration stage.

Regulatory requirements
All states in the U.S. have laws requiring installation of erosion and sediment controls (ESCs) on construction sites of a specified size. Federal regulations require ESCs on sites  and larger. Smaller sites which are part of a common plan of development (e.g. a residential subdivision) are also required to have ESCs. In some states, non-contiguous sites under  are also required to have ESCs. The sediment controls must be installed before the beginning of land disturbance (i.e. land clearing, grubbing and grading) and must be maintained during the entire disturbance phase of construction.

See also
Certified Professional in Erosion and Sediment Control (CPESC)
Geotechnical engineering
Geotextile (material used in erosion & sediment controls)
Nonpoint source pollution
Stormwater
Universal Soil Loss Equation

References

External links
Siltbuster - a UK rental company of Lamella Clarifiers for the construction industry.
Erosion Control - a trade magazine for the erosion control and construction industries
International Erosion Control Association - Professional Association, Publications, Training
“Developing Your Stormwater Pollution Prevention Plan: A Guide for Construction Sites.” - U.S. EPA

Construction
Environmental soil science
Earthworks (engineering)
Gardening aids
Stormwater management